Sacred Heart Malankara Syrian Catholic Church or referred as S H Church is located in the village of Mylapra, near Pathanamthitta, on the road side of the Main Eastern Highway in the Indian state of Kerala. It is home to one of the first Syro-Malankara Catholic Church communities and is the biggest and oldest established church in the Eparchy of Pathanamthitta. This church is the patron of two schools, Mount Bethany EHSS and S H Higher Secondary School.

History 

Soon after the reunion movement in 1930 by Archbishop Geevarghese Mar Ivanios, about five families from Mylapra reached Thirumoolapuram and behold the Catholic Faith in the presence of Jacob Mar Theophilos. They established a small chapel named St. George Malankara Catholic Church in Mylapra on 9 June 1932 with 29 families and 106 members. Rev. Fr. M.T Philipos (Kumbazha Achan) served as the first Vicar of the parish. The history of the Catholic Church in Mylapra took a diversion on 19 January 1936 when Rev. Fr. A.G. Abraham Thengumtharamedayil (Mylapra Achan) with a large group of more than 100 families embraced the Syro-Malankara Catholic Church before Archbishop Geevarghese Mar Ivanios at a ceremony held in the Mylapra school. When the community grew up, it was essential to build a large church to accommodate the faithful and so on 13 March 1941, foundation stone for the church was laid by Archbishop Geevarghese Mar Ivanios. It was the work of Rev. Fr. A.G. Abraham Thengumtharamedayil and K.I. Thomas. Construction was completed on 15 September 1944. But the name changed to Sacred Heart Malankara Catholic Church, due to the request made by a German family who was the main sponsors. Rev. Fr. A.G. Abraham Thengumtharamedayil was the first vicar of this church. After 58 yrs, in 2002, the parish vicar and the committee members decided to reconstruct the church due to the lack of space. The foundation stone was laid by Cyril Baselios on 12 January 2003 and was reconstructed under the leadership of Rev. Fr. John G Vadakepuram and M T Thomas Mannil. The church was consecrated by Baselios Cleemis along with Joshua Mar Ignathios and Yoohanon Mar Chrysostom in a ceremony held on 28 and 29 December 2007.

Educational institutions 
Mount Bethany English Higher Secondary School, Mylapra
Sacred Heart Higher Secondary School, Mylapra
Sacred Heart Teachers Training College, Mylapra

Gallery

References

External links 
The Official Website
The Eparchy of Pathanmthitta
Malankara Catholic News

Eastern Catholic churches in Kerala
Syro-Malankara Catholic church buildings
Churches in Pathanamthitta district
Churches completed in 1932